The Stockholm Concert Hall is the main hall for orchestral music in Stockholm, Sweden.

With a design by Ivar Tengbom chosen in competition, inaugurated in 1926, the Hall is home to the Royal Stockholm Philharmonic Orchestra.  It is also where the awarding ceremonies for the Nobel Prize and the Polar Music Prize are held annually.  The interior includes work by Ewald Dahlskog, and the walls and ceiling in the minor hall, now known as Grünewald Hall, were painted by Isaac Grünewald.  The exterior is the site of sculptor Carl Milles' 1936 bronze fountain, the Orfeus-brunnen ("the Orpheus Well").

The blue building lies to the east of Hötorget.

Many pop and rock concerts by famous artists have taken place at the Stockholm Concert Hall.

Construction of the concert hall was funded in part by a testamentary donation from Rosa Nachmanson.

Gallery

See also 
 List of concert halls

References

External links 
 Official homepage

Buildings and structures in Stockholm
Concert halls in Sweden
Music in Stockholm
Nobel Prize
Tourist attractions in Stockholm
1926 establishments in Sweden
Music venues completed in 1926